This Old House is an American home improvement media brand with television shows, a magazine and a website, ThisOldHouse.com. The brand is headquartered in Stamford, CT. The television series airs on the American television station Public Broadcasting Service (PBS) and follows remodeling projects of houses over a number of weeks.

Note: Episodes are listed in the original broadcast order

Season 21 (1999–2000)
Steve Thomas's eleventh season as the host.
Starting with this season, This Old House and The New Yankee Workshop go online, and was renamed "www.pbs.org/wgbh/thisoldhouse".

Season 22 (2000–01)
Steve Thomas's twelfth season as the host.

Season 23 (2001–02)
Steve Thomas's thirteenth season as the host, and This Old House Ventures bought the series from WGBH.
This is the last season to have Fats Waller's "Louisiana Fairy Tale" as the original This Old House theme song. It had been in use since This Old House debuted in 1979.

Season 24 (2002–03)
This is the last season with Steve Thomas as the host, who had been with the series since joining This Old House in 1989. Ask This Old House debuted on PBS in primetime.
Due to music rights issues, This Old House no longer used Fats Waller's "Louisiana Fairy Tale" as the show's original theme song. This Old House introduced a new theme song; "This Old House '97", composed by Peter Bell.

Season 25 (2003–04)
Starting with this season, This Old House celebrates its 25th anniversary, and introduced its current host Kevin O'Connor. This season was creator Russell Morash's last as Executive Producer and Director.

Season 26 (2004–05)
Kevin O'Connor's second season as the host.

Season 27 (2005–06)
Kevin O'Connor's third season as the host.

Season 28 (2006–07)
Kevin O'Connor's fourth season as the host.
This is the last season to broadcast in 480i SDTV.

Season 29 (2007–08)
Kevin O'Connor's fifth season as the host.
Starting with this season, This Old House and Ask This Old House began broadcasting in HDTV.
This is the last season to have the This Old House theme song; "This Old House '97", composed by Peter Bell.

Season 30 (2008–09)
Kevin O'Connor's sixth season as the host, and This Old House celebrates its 30th anniversary.
Beginning with this season, This Old House introduced a new theme song, to celebrate the show's 30th anniversary.

References

External links

This Old House at cptv.org

This Old House